The Minions of Midas is a 2020 Spanish thriller drama web television limited series created by Miguel Barros and Mateo Gil and starring Luis Tosar, Marta Belmonte and Guillermo Toledo. It is loosely based on the same-titled short story by Jack London.

Cast 
 Luis Tosar as Víctor Genovés
  as Mónica Báez
 Guillermo Toledo as Inspector Conte
  as Luis
 Marta Milans as María José
  as Natalia
 Jorge Andreu as Marcos
 Daniel Holguín as Raúl
 Bea Segura as Laura
  as Mauro
 Juan Blanco as Daniel
 Vito Sanz as Tucho
 Elena Irureta as Teresa Jiménez
 Ana Gracia as Pilar Robles
 Miguel Ángel Solá as Sabino
 Tania Watson as Agente Udev 6
 Juanma Díez as Agente Udev 5
  as Javier

Episodes

Release
The Minions of Midas was released on 13 November 2020 on Netflix.

References

External links
 
 

2020s Spanish drama television series
2020 Spanish television series debuts
2020 Spanish television series endings
Spanish crime television series
Spanish-language Netflix original programming
Television shows set in Madrid
Television shows based on works by Jack London